Juliana Canfield is an American actress. She is best known for her role as Jess Jordan on the HBO series Succession (2018–present). She was also main cast member Beth DeVille on the post-apocalyptic drama Y: The Last Man (2021).

Early life 
Canfield is a graduate of the David Geffen School of Drama at Yale University, graduating with an MFA in Acting in 2017. Canfield also earned a Bachelor of Arts degree majoring in English and graduated cum laude from Yale College in 2014.

Career 
Canfield played the role of Christina in the 2019 revival of Maria Irene Fornes's play Fefu and Her Friends at the Theatre for a New Audience in Brooklyn. Canfield has featured in the recurring role of Kendall Roy's executive assistant, Jess Jordan, in the HBO comedy-drama Succession, first appearing in the show's second episode, and continuing to recur throughout the first and second seasons. Canfield's role as Jordan was highlighted by The Ringer critic Jessica MacLeish in an article titled 'An Ode to Jess Jordan' during the second season. She is scheduled to continue the role in the upcoming third season of the show. In 2021, Canfield starred as Beth DeVille, the girlfriend of lead character Yorick Brown, the only male survivor of a virus that wipes out all others with a Y-chromosome, on the FX comic-book adaptation Y: The Last Man.

Filmography

References

External links 

 
 

American film actresses
American television actresses
Living people
21st-century American actresses
1992 births